PoraMon2 is a Bangladeshi Bengali romantic drama film written and directed by Raihan Rafi and produced by Abdul Aziz. It is distributed by Jaaz Multimedia. Starring Siam Ahmed and Puja Cherry and Bapparaj in the lead roles. It is the sequel of 2013 film PoraMon starring Symon Sadik and Mahiya Mahi. The film was released in Eid Ul Fitr of 2018. The film was a commercial success. Music Directed By Rizvi Hasan.

Plot  
The only daughter of day laborer Kafil Mia, Jasmine, committed suicide by hanging herself on the darkness of the night, because her lover Kabir betrayed her. Since self-murder is not accepted in Islam, there is no place for the funeral and grave of Jasmine's dead body in the Islam inhabited Shwapnopuri village. A mosque imam and an influential rich man of the village with the help of Badrul Talukder did not let the funeral and grave take place in the village. Kafil Mia digs his daughter's grave in the Khas land (government owned land) on the bank of the river and performs her funeral. No one from the village took part in the funeral but, a small ten-year-old boy Sujon did. Kafil Mia could not accept his daughters death, but he begins to search for hope and strength in the midst of this tragedy. After 10 years, Pori and Sujon fell in love with each other but Pori's family did not accept it. So, Sujon and Pori decided to escape from their village. The film ended with a tragic event.

Cast 
 Siam Ahmed as Sujon Shah 
 Puja Cherry as Pori
 Bapparaj as Norshed
 Fazlur Rahman Babu

Soundtrack

Awards

References

External links 
 

2018 films
2010s Bengali-language films
Bengali-language Bangladeshi films
Best Bengali Feature Film National Film Award winners
Jaaz Multimedia films
Films directed by Raihan Rafi